Luis Liendo may refer to:
 Luis Liendo (footballer, born 1978)
 Luis Liendo (footballer, born 1949)
 Luis Liendo (wrestler)